The 1998 season was the 86th year of competitive soccer in the United States.

National team

Record

Results
The home team or the team that is designated as the home team is listed in the left column; the away team is in the right column.

Goalscorers

Major League Soccer

Standings

The top four teams in each conference make the playoffs.

Wins (W) are worth 3 points.Shootout Wins (SW) are worth 1 point, and is considered a Win in the standings.
Shootout Loss (SL) are worth 0 points, and is considered a Loss in the standings.Loss (L) are worth 0 points.

Playoffs

Best of Three series winners will advance.

MLS Cup

Lamar Hunt U.S. Open Cup

Bracket
Home teams listed on top of bracket

Final

American clubs in international competitions

D.C. United

Colorado Rapids

References
 American competitions at RSSSF
 American national team matches at RSSSF
 CONCACAF Champions' Cup at RSSSF

 
Seasons in American soccer